Neethu, also known as Neethu Shetty, is an Indian actress who predominantly appears in Kannada-language films and a few Tulu and Malayalam films. She won acclaim and praise for movies like Joke Falls (2004), Beru (2005), Photographer (2006), Koti Chennaya (2007), Gaalipata (2008), Krishna Nee Late Aagi Baaro (2009) and many others.

She has done cameos in other successful movies like Abhinetri and Fair & Lovely. She has worked with notable actors Ramesh Aravind, V. Ravichandran, Mohanlal, H. G. Dattatreya, Kishore Kumar G, Ganesh, Jaggesh, Doddanna, Anant Nag, Diganth.

Career

Neethu Shetty acted in Punya, a serial directed by Nagathihalli Chandrashekhar and made her debut through the Jaggesh and Komal-starrer Govinda Gopala and then went on to act in a horror flick Yahoo, which was an average grosser. Her first commercially successful movie was Joke Falls, where she was paired alongside Ramesh Aravind, which was positively reviewed, and was directed by Ashok Patil. She then starred in the movie Beru, directed by P. Sheshadri, which received many accolades such as National Film Award for Best Feature Film in Kannada and Karnataka State Film Award for Best Film.

She made her Malayalam debut alongside Mohanlal in the Malayalam film Photographer. She is a recipient of the Karnataka State Film Award for Best Supporting Actress for her performance in the Tulu language film Koti Chennaya. Her performance in her next movie, Poojari, opposite Aadhi Lokesh, brought her closer to the Kannada audience. She received positive reviews for her performance in the 2008 movie Gaalipata, which was a multi-starrer and a blockbuster hit. She received a Filmfare Award for Best Supporting Actress – Kannada nomination. She later starred in films which some were successful, like Krishna Nee Late Aagi Baaro, Abhinetri and a few others. She also starred in movies such as Aithalakkadi and others that received negative reviews and failed at the box office.

She was a contestant in Bigg Boss Kannada 2, where she survived 80 days, hence becoming the first contestant in the history of Bigg Boss Kannada to be kept in a "secret room". She was a part of the comedy show Bengaluru Benne Dose alongside Arun Sagar. She later appeared as a guest in Bigg Boss Kannada 4 along with Rishika Singh, Tsunami Kitty, N. C. Ayyappa and Bigg Boss Kannada 3 winner Shruti. She also was a part of box cricket league where she was a player for the team Davangere Lions, which emerged runners up.

Early life
Neethu was born on 2 September 1981 in Mangalore, in the Karnataka State of India. Her father, Manjunath Shetty, was from the Bunt community and her mother, Mohini is from a Konkani speaking family. Neethu has a younger sister. They grew up and were educated in Mangalore. Her father died in 2011.

Filmography

Awards and nominations

Television

References

External links 
 

Indian film actresses
Living people
Actresses from Mangalore
Actresses in Kannada cinema
Year of birth missing (living people)
Actresses in Konkani cinema
Actresses in Malayalam cinema
21st-century Indian actresses
Indian television actresses
Actresses in Kannada television
Bigg Boss Kannada contestants
Actresses in Tulu cinema